

Men's events

Open events

Medal table

References

Events at the 1983 Pan American Games
Sailing at the Pan American Games
Sailing competitions in Venezuela